The Long Good-Bye is a 1971 novel by Yury Trifonov. It is the third of five volumes in his Moscow cycle.

References

1971 novels
Novels by Yury Trifonov